The Olalla brothers's titi monkey (Plecturocebus olallae) is a species of titi monkey, a type of New World monkey, endemic to Bolivia.There are between 110 and 150 individuals in the wild.

References

Ollala brothers's titi
Mammals of Bolivia
Endemic fauna of Bolivia
Ollala brothers's titi
Taxa named by Einar Lönnberg